The New South Wales Nurses and Midwives' Association (NSWNMA) is a trade union which represents nurses and midwives in both the public and private sectors of New South Wales, Australia. It was formed in 1931 and has a membership of over 70,000.

The NSWNMA is affiliated with UnionsNSW and ACTU, and in 1988 signed a "harmonisation" agreement with the Australian Nursing Federation (ANF) which recognizes eligible members of the NSWNMA as members of the New South Wales Branch of the ANF.

At the Annual Conference in August 2012, delegates overwhelmingly voted in favour of changing the union's name from the former New South Wales Nurses' Association to the New South Wales Nurses and Midwives' Association, a name it had held since its formation in 1931. The new name better reflects the union's membership base, which comprises both nurses and midwives.

References

External links
 

Trade unions in New South Wales
Nursing organisations in Australia
Trade unions established in 1931
1931 establishments in Australia
Medical and health organisations based in New South Wales